Duchess Maria Dorothea of Württemberg (Maria Dorothea Luise Wilhelmine Caroline; 1 November 1797 in Carlsruhe (now Pokój), Silesia – 30 March 1855 in Pest, Hungary) was the daughter of Duke Louis of Württemberg (1756–1817) and Princess Henriette of Nassau-Weilburg (1780–1857).

Family

Maria Dorothea was the eldest of five children born to Duke Louis of Württemberg and his second wife Princess Henriette of Nassau-Weilburg. She was born in Carlsruhe (now Pokój), Silesia, now Poland.

Her brother Alexander was the grandfather of Mary of Teck, the future queen consort of George V of the United Kingdom.

She was tutored by her governess, the known memoirist Alexandrine des Écherolles, who described her pupils in her memoirs.

Marriage and children

She was the third wife of Archduke Joseph, Palatine of Hungary, to whom she was married on 24 August 1819. They had five children:

Ancestry

References

Citations

Source

 Montgomery-Massingberd, Hugh. Burke's Royal Families of the World, Volume 1: Europe & Latin America (1977), London, UK: Burke's Peerage Ltd, page 22.

House of Habsburg-Lorraine
1797 births
1855 deaths
Duchesses of Württemberg
Austrian princesses
People from Namysłów County
Burials at Palatinal Crypt
People from the Province of Silesia